Karl or Carl Schawerda (4 February 1869 in Újezd,  Moravia –  11 September 1945 in Vienna) was an Austrian Czech entomologist who specialised in Lepidoptera.

Karl Schawerda was a physician of Czech origin, a gynecologist and entomologist  mainly devoted to researching moths, but also has significant as an author describing some of the new forms of Parnassius apollo Linnaeus, 1758.

His father was a railway engineer. After primary and secondary education he studied  medicine at the University of Vienna,  After graduation in 1894 a gynecologist for four years at the Krankenhaus St. Anna Kinderhospital in Vienna. Later he worked as a gynecologist and obstetrician in Vienna. In his practice he achieved the rank of "Obermedizinalrat" – "chief medical advisor.
He described several new species of moths. His collection of 50,000 specimens is mostly stored in Naturhistorisches Museum in Vienna. A smaller portion of his collection, mainly Palaearctic species of Microlepidoptera Übersee Museum Bremen in Bremen.

Works
Partial list

Schawerda, K.: 1908, Bericht über lepidopterologische Sammelreisen in Bosnien und in der Hercegovina. Jahr. des Wiener Ent. Ver. Jahrg. XIX: 85–126.
Schawerda, K.: 1910, Zwei Arctiidenformen aus Bosnien und der Hrzegowina. Verhandlungen der kaiserlich – königlichen zoologisch – botanischen Gesellschaft in Wien, 60, 90–93.

References
Translation Slovakia Wikipedia
 Anonymous: Schawerda, Karl (1869–1945). In: Österreichisches Biograpfisches Lexicon: 1815–1950, Bd. 10 (Lfg. 46), 54
 Durbešić, P., 1985. Počeci entomoloških istraživanja u Hrvatskoj s bibliografijom (od prvih pisanih podataka do osnutka Jugoslavenskog entomološkog društva 1926. godine). Acta entomol. Jugosl. 1984th Vol. 20. Suppl.: 7–56
 Horn, W., Kahle, I., Friese, G., Gaedike, R.: 1990, Collectiones entomologicae. Eine Kompendium  Teil. I & II, Akad. d. Landw. d. DDR, Berlin, 573rd
 Nonveiller, G.: 1999, The Pioneers of the Research on the Insects of Dalmatia: 248–249.
 Killy, W. & Vierhaus, R.: 1999, Karl Schawerda in Deutsche Biographische Encyclopedia (DBE), Band 8, KG Saur, München, 578th
 Gaedike, R. & Groll, EK eds. 2001, Entomologen der Welt (Biografien, Sammlungsverbleib). Datenbank, DEI Eberswalde im ZALF e. V.: "Schawerda Karl.

External links
Biologiezenrtum In German. Gives collecting countries and publication list.

1869 births
1945 deaths
People from Znojmo District
People from the Margraviate of Moravia
Austrian lepidopterists